The Cobasna ammunition depot is a large ammunition depot located in the village of Cobasna. Legally and internationally recognized as part of Moldova as a whole, the unrecognized breakaway state of Transnistria controls the village and the ammunition depot and has denied access to international observers, an exception being the Russian military forces located in the region ever since the end of the Transnistria War in 1992. Currently, civilian access to the ammunition depot is restricted and only the Russian and Transnistrian authorities have detailed information regarding the amount and situation of the stored weapons. The ammunition depot was created in the 1940s, when Transnistria was under the former Soviet Union (USSR). At the time, it held important strategic value.

The Cobasna ammunition depot has been referred to as one of the largest if not the largest ammunition depot in Eastern Europe and contains up to 20,000 tons of Soviet-era weapons from the 14th Guards Army of the USSR and also from the former states of Czechoslovakia and East Germany. Currently, it is guarded by around 1,500 Russian soldiers. Ever since Russia's conflict with Ukraine, there has been growing distress in Moldova for the Cobasna ammunition depot, with some believing that the weapons there could be used in a potential future military conflict. Additionally, the Academy of Sciences of Moldova determined that an explosion of the weapons located in the ammunition depot, which passed their expiry date long ago, would be equivalent to the atomic bombings of Hiroshima and Nagasaki. Concern for such an event increased following the 2020 Beirut explosion.

There have been several attempts and calls to withdraw both the weapons from the Cobasna ammunition depot and the Russian soldiers from Transnistria. During the 1999 Istanbul summit, Russia promised to completely withdraw its weapons and soldiers. Some progress was made, but following a request from the Transnistrian authorities asking Russia to maintain its army, the process stopped in 2003. Thus, to this day, Russia maintains its military presence in Transnistria and in the ammunition depot, with Russia having been accused of using the latter as a method of geopolitical blackmail against Moldova.

Moldova continues to insist on the need to evacuate the weapons from Cobasna, with the most recent official declarations coming from Maia Sandu, the current president of Moldova, and having been made as recently as in 2021. In fact, on 11 August of the same year, Sandu met with the then Deputy Kremlin Chief of Staff of Russia Dmitry Kozak and discussed several important issues in the bilateral relations between both countries, including the Transnistria conflict and the situation of the Cobasna ammunition depot. Regarding the latter, Kozak showed willingness to cooperate with Moldova to destroy the weapons at the depot and declared that it was within Russia's interests to do this. The then President of Transnistria, Vadim Krasnoselsky, also expressed support to the initiative.

On 27 April 2022, the Ministry of Internal Affairs of Transnistria reported that drones flew over Cobasna and that shots were fired on the village. The ministry claimed that the drones came from Ukraine. Several attacks had recently occurred in Transnistria at the time. They occurred during the 2022 Russian invasion of Ukraine, and may have been a false flag operation by Russia or Transnistria itself.

See also
 Operational Group of Russian Forces

References

Ammunition dumps
Military installations of the Soviet Union
Transnistria conflict
Moldova–Russia relations
1940s establishments in the Moldavian Soviet Socialist Republic